Baumgartenberg is a municipality in the district Perg in the Austrian state of Upper Austria.

Geography
Baumgartenberg lies at round 237 meters. The extension is 4.5 kilometers from north to south, from west to east 6.8 kilometers. The total area is 15.7 kilometers ². 23.6% of the area is forested, 63.7% of the area ais used for agriculture.

Quarters include Amesbach, Au, Baumgartenberg, Deiming, Hehenberger, High, Kolbinger, Kühofen, Fiefs, Mettensdorf, Muhlberg, Obergassolding, Pitzing, Schneckenreit, Steindl and Untergassolding.

Population

References

Cities and towns in Perg District